Robin Mark Le Mesurier Halliley (22 March 1953 – 22 December 2021) was a British guitarist, known for his long collaborations with Rod Stewart and Johnny Hallyday, as well as for the wide-ranging nature of his musical performance, including membership of such bands as The Wombles.

Life

Le Mesurier was the son of two of Britain's best-loved comedy actors, Hattie Jacques and John Le Mesurier. Le Mesurier gained a strong following during and after his appearance on Living TV's reality show Rehab (2009), in which he opened up about his battle with alcoholism.

Education
Le Mesurier was educated at Sussex House School, where he described himself as being "completely out of place", and then Westminster City grammar school. This was also an unhappy experience and Le Mesurier would be teased about his famous mother. As a teenager he was offered a place at the Royal College of Music but turned it down.

Music 
In his prime, Le Mesurier was a fan of The Faces and of guitar stars Eric Clapton, Jimi Hendrix, John Lee Hooker, Muddy Waters, and Jeff Beck. His first official band was The Reign (whose first single was written by the Yardbirds members Keith Relf and Jim McCarty). The band lasted until 1973, then Le Mesurier became the guitarist of The Wombles, Mike Batt's novelty pop band that played his music for the British children's TV show The Wombles.

At the beginning of his collaboration with Rod Stewart, Le Mesurier was mainly a guitar technician and session musician. In 1976 he signed with a record company with which Rod Stewart was associated. He toured the United States with Air Supply in 1977 as the opening act for Rod Stewart. After a period with Lion, eventually renamed The Difference, he was invited in 1980 to join the Rod Stewart group.

In 1994, he recorded two tracks on French singer Johnny Hallyday's first English-language record Rough Town. He became Hallyday's musical director, besides founding the group Farm Dogs with Bernie Taupin and Jim Cregan.

In September 2015, Le Mesurier joined Rod Stewart and Rolling Stone Ronnie Wood for the Faces reunion.

TV series 
Le Mesurier appeared in a double episode in the TV series Sport Crime playing himself.
The plot is about a campaign in which rock stars voluntarily submit to anti-doping rules the same as sportsmen.
 
Sport Crime is the first ever series based on sports investigation. Showrunner Daniela Scalia states that the main character "Dabs is a former rugbyman who is a rock fanatic, having Rolling Stones, Faces, Rod and Bowie as main life references. Hence the connection, Luca (Dabs) is the ultimate Rod encyclopedia, from Brentford to the Faces reunion… (which include Robin)”.

Personal life and death 

Le Mesurier died of cancer on 22 December 2021, at the age of 68.

Discography

Reign 
1970: "Line of Least Resistance" / "Natural Lovin' Man" (single)

Limey 
1976: Limey
1977: Silver Eagle

Lion 
1980: Running All Night

With Ron Wood 
1981: 1234

With Rod Stewart 
1981: Tonight I'm Yours
1982: Absolutely Live
1983: Body Wishes
1984: Camouflage
1986: Every Beat of My Heart

Farm Dogs 
1996: Last Stand in Open Country
1998: Immigrant Sons

With Johnny Hallyday 
1994: Rough Town
1994: À La Cigale (inédit, sortie en 2003)
1996: Lorada Tour
1996: Destination Vegas
1996: Live at the Aladdin Theatre (inédit, sortie en 2003)
1998: Stade de France 98 Johnny allume le feu
1999: Sang pour sang
2000: 100% Johnny: Live à la tour Eiffel
2000: Olympia 2000
2000: Good Rockin' Tonight The Legacy of Sun Records
2003: Parc des Princes 2003
2006: Flashback tour: Palais des sports 2006
2007: Le Cœur d'un homme
2007: La Cigale: 12-17 décembre 2006
2009: Tour 66: Stade de France 2009
2013: On Stage
2013: Born Rocker Tour
2014: Rester vivant
2016: Rester Vivant Tour

References

External links
 
 

1953 births
2021 deaths
English male guitarists
English rock guitarists
People from Kensington
British people of Channel Islands descent
People educated at Sussex House School